Howrah–Ranchi Intercity Express is an Intercity train belonging to South Eastern Railway zone that runs between  and . It is currently being operated with 22891/22892 train numbers on tri-weekly basis.

Service

Route and halts

Coach composition
The train consists of 14 coaches:

 2 AC chair car
 5 second sitting
 5 general unreserved
 2 second-class luggage/parcel van

Traction
Both trains are hauled by a Santragachi Loco Shed-based WAP-4 or Santragachi Loco Shed-based WAP-7 electric locomotive from Howrah to Ranchi, and vice versa.

Notes 
Runs three days a week in both directions.

References

External links 

 22891/Howrah–Ranchi Intercity Express (via Tatanagar) India Rail Info
 22892/Ranchi–Howrah Intercity Express (via Tatanagar) India Rail Info

Rail transport in Howrah
Rail transport in West Bengal
Rail transport in Jharkhand
Intercity Express (Indian Railways) trains
Transport in Ranchi